The Cordillera Oriental is the widest of the three branches of the Colombian Andes. The range extends from south to north dividing from the Colombian Massif in Huila Department to Norte de Santander Department where it splits into the Serranía del Perijá and the Cordillera de Mérida in Venezuelan Andes.

Geography 
The western part of the Cordillera Oriental belongs to the Magdalena River basin, while the eastern part includes the river basins of the Amazon River, Orinoco River, and Catatumbo River. Within it, the Altiplano Cundiboyacense and the Sierra Nevada del Cocuy (with the only snowy peaks in this mountain range) stand out. The mountain range contains the most páramos in the world.

The Cordillera Oriental montane forests ecoregion covers the eastern slopes of the cordillera and its northern end. The Magdalena Valley montane forests cover the western slopes. The Northern Andean páramo covers the highest elevations.

Protected areas 
 Cueva de los Guácharos
 Chingaza National Natural Park
 Yariguíes National Park
 Sierra Nevada del Cocuy
 Sumapaz Páramo
 Tamá National Natural Park
 Los Estoraques Unique Natural Area
 Lake Iguaque
 Guanentá Alto Río Fonce Flora and Fauna Sanctuary
 Catatumbo Barí National Natural Park
 Los Picachos National Natural Park
 Pisba National Natural Park

Regional geology

See also 

 Geography of Colombia
 Altiplano Cundiboyacense, Bogotá savanna, Tenza Valley
 Cordillera Central, Occidental, Andean Region, Venezuelan Andes, continuation of this mountain system

References 

Mountain ranges of the Andes
Mountain ranges of Colombia
.